Javine may refer to:

Javine Hylton, a British singer
Javinė, a household god in Lithuanian mythology who protects grain in barns